The SportPesa Super Cup is an association football competition that took place in June 2017 in Dar Es Salaam, Tanzania.

The competition was created and sponsored by bookmakers SportPesa.

All matches took place at Uhuru Stadium.

Overview

The 2017 SportPesa Super Cup was the inaugural edition of an eight-team knockout tournament featuring four teams each from Kenya and Tanzania created and sponsored by bookmakers SportPesa.
 
SportsPesa sponsored six of the participating teams, Gor Mahia FC, AFC Leopards SC and Nakuru AllStars FC from Kenya and Yanga SC, Simba SC and Singida United FC from Tanzania. Tusker FC (Kenya) and Jang’ombe Boys SC (Zanzibar) were selected to join them in the competition.
 
The tournament started at the quarterfinal stage with penalties separating the teams in case of a draw at regulation time. The quarter final draw pit Leopards vs Singida, Yanga vs Tusker, Gor vs Jang'ombe and Simba vs AllStars.

Everton FC
The winner of the 2017 SportPesa Super Cup also got a chance to play against the English Premier League giants, Everton FC, on 13 July 2017. During Everton's first visit to East Africa, they played tournament winner Gor Mahia as part of their agreement with bookmaker SportPesa to develop football in East Africa.

Participants

Kenya
  Gor Mahia F.C.[Mayienga]
  A.F.C. Leopards
  Tusker FC
  Nakuru AllStars 

Tanzania
  Young Africans S.C.
  Simba S.C.
  Singida United 

Zanzibar
  Jang'ombe Boys F.C.

Matches

Quarter-finals

Semi-finals

Final

Prize money

 Winner: $30,000  
 Runner-up: $10,000
 Semi-finalists: $5,000
 Quarter-finalists: $2,500

References

2017 in African football
2017 in Tanzanian sport
International association football competitions hosted by Tanzania